The National Council for Promotion of Urdu Language (NCPUL) is an autonomous regulatory body in the Government of India.  It is the main authority of Urdu language and education in India, being one of two authorities responsible for the regulation of Urdu, the other being the National Language Authority of Pakistan.
The National Council for Promotion of Urdu Language (NCPUL) is an autonomous body under the Ministry of Education, Department of Secondary and Higher Education, Government of India. Set up to promote, develop and propagate Urdu language, Council started its operation in Delhi on April 1, 1996. In its capacity as the National Nodal Agency for the promotion of the Urdu language NCPUL is the principal coordinating and monitoring authority for promotion of Urdu language and Urdu education.

Functions and objectives 
 To undertake the production of literature in the Urdu language, including books on science and other branches of modern knowledge, the children's literature textbooks, reference works, encyclopaedia, dictionaries, etc.
 To collect and evolve technical terms relating to various disciplines of knowledge in order to enrich the Urdu language.
 To undertake and provide for publication of journals and periodicals in furtherance of its objects.
 To arrange for the sale of publications and their exhibitions both inside and outside the country on from time to time.
 To promote and help in development of computerization with a view to develop the Urdu language to meet the advanced technological requirements of the age.
 To formulate/implement schemes and projects for the teaching of the Urdu language through the mediums of English and Hindi and other Modern Indian Languages including, teaching through the correspondence courses.
 To liaise with the State Governments and other agencies in matters relating to promotion and development of the Urdu language.
 To provide financial assistance and guidance to Non-Government Organizations for propagation of the Urdu language.
 To co-ordinate the activities of the state Urdu academies.
 To obtain or accept subscriptions, donations, grants, gifts, devices and bequests from any person, corporation or institution in furtherance of the objectives of society.
 To undertake such other other activities as may be conducive to the aforesaid objects of the society.

See also
 Jamiatul Qasim Darul Uloom Al-Islamiah
 DD Urdu
 Geographic Distribution of Urdu
 Languages of India
 Dakhni
 Urdu in Aurangabad

References

External links
 

Urdu in India
Urdu
1996 establishments in Delhi
Government agencies established in 1996